Gerald 'Gerry' Charles Hardstaff (4 February 1940 – 28 March 2015) was an English cricketer.  Hardstaff was a right-handed batsman who bowled right-arm medium pace.  He was born at Crewe, Cheshire.

Hardstaff made his debut for Cheshire in the 1960 Minor Counties Championship against the Warwickshire Second XI.  Fisher played Minor counties cricket for Cheshire from 1960 to 1978, including 89 Minor Counties Championship matches  In 1964, he made his List A debut against Surrey in the 1964 Gillette Cup.  He played three further List A matches for Cheshire, the last of which came against Northamptonshire in the 1968 Gillette Cup.  In his four List A matches for Cheshire, he scored 45 runs at a batting average of 11.25, with a high score of 45.  With the ball he took 5 wickets at a bowling average of 24.40, with best figures of 4/31.

Hardstaff also played two List A matches for Minor Counties North in the 1972 Benson & Hedges Cup against Nottinghamshire and Lancashire.  In his two matches for the team he scored 19 runs and took 4 wickets at an average of 13.25, with best figures of 3/39.

He died on 28 March 2015 at St Luke's Hospice in Winsford, Cheshire, following a battle with cancer.

References

External links
Gerry Hardstaff at ESPNcricinfo
Gerry Hardstaff at CricketArchive

1940 births
2015 deaths
Cricketers from Cheshire
Sportspeople from Crewe
English cricketers
Cheshire cricketers
Minor Counties cricketers
Deaths from cancer in England